Prime Minister Ahmad Qavam formed a short-lived coalition government on 1 August 1946 with his Democrat Party of Iran and the left-wing Tudeh Party and Iran Party. He offered three portfolios (Health, culture, and trade and industry) to the communists and gave the ministries of finance and communications to two royalists; while maintained his own control over interior and foreign ministries.

According to Ervand Abrahamian, Qavam did not consult the Shah before forming his cabinet. Shah ordered Qavam to resign on 16 October 1946. Following the resignation, Qavam formed another cabinet without Tudeh and Iran parties.

Cabinet

References

1946 establishments in Iran
1946 disestablishments in Iran
Cabinets established in 1946
Cabinets disestablished in 1946
Cabinets of Iran
Coalition governments
Communism in Iran
Tudeh Party of Iran